WJRF (89.5 FM) is a radio station in Duluth, Minnesota. The station currently simulcasts Contemporary Christian KDNW. Historically, it was its own station and the centerpiece of a regional Christian network prior to its donation to Northwestern Media in 2019.

History
The WJRF license was authorized in 1982 as WNCB. It was owned by North-Central Christian Broadcasting. WNCB moved from 89.1 to 89.3 MHz in 1992 and to 89.5 in 2002. In the early 1990s, it began to build out a translator network, including a short-lived venture into the Twin Cities that was forced off the air by a relocated full-power station.

Shortly after the move to 89.5, North-Central Christian Broadcasting renamed itself Refuge Media Group. The WJRF call letters were adopted in 2004. In the early 2010s, several Refuge translators were sold off to commercial broadcasters to retransmit AM stations.

On July 2, 2019, Refuge Media Group filed to donate the entire network of three main stations and 13 Refuge-owned translators to the University of Northwestern – St. Paul, which disbanded the network and used its frequencies (except WJRF) to broadcast other Northwestern stations in its Life and Faith networks. Refuge-operated translators owned by third parties, such as Minn-Iowa Christian Broadcasting, were not included in the transaction.

In February 2020 WJRF was granted a construction permit by the FCC, to improve its signal from a class A station using 1,650 watts of power to a class C1 station using 40,000 watts of power.

Translators
In operation, Refuge had 13 translators at the end of its life, as well as two full-power licenses outside of Duluth, KRGM in Marshall and KRFG in Nashwauk. These stations became full-power repeaters of Northwestern Media Life stations, and the translators were divided among Northwestern's existing Life and Faith stations.

The following translators were not owned by Refuge Media Group and thus not part of the donation of the network. The Estherville translator repeats off-air a translator reassigned to a Northwestern station and is being donated to Northwestern as of February 2020.

References

External links
Refuge Radio

Christian radio stations in Minnesota
Radio stations in Duluth, Minnesota
Radio stations in Superior, Wisconsin
Northwestern Media
University of Northwestern – St. Paul